Arayoor is a small village in Neyyattinkara Taluk in Thiruvananthapuram District, India. It comes under Chenkal Panchayath. It belongs to South Kerala Division. Arayoor is located 5 km from Parassala, 6 km from Neyyattinkara and 30 km from Thiruvananthapuram. The village has a post office. The Arayoor pin code is 695122.

Arayoor has gained recognition for the great saint of Abhedashrama, Swami Abhedanandhiji. Writer C. V. Raman Pillai and Travancore General officer commanding Maj Gen V. N. Parameswaran Pillai (Kuttan Pillai) were born in Arayoor

Udiyankulangara, Neyyattinkara, Parassala are close. Dhanuvachapuram and Parassala are nearby railway stations. Malayalam is the local language and agriculture is the main occupation of the people. A large proportion of them work outside India, mainly in the Middle East. There is a cashew nut factory in the village. A village contains many man made ponds and is surrounded by agricultural land. The major crop cultivated includes Banana, Tapioca, cucumber(seasonal).

Famous persons
 C. V. Raman Pillai - Novelist, playwright, journalist, social activist
 Maj Gen V.N. Parameswaran Pillai – the last General officer commanding  of the Travancore Nair Army

Temple 
Arayoor Major Sree Mahadeva Temple
 
Aarayoor Major Sree Mahadevar temple is a major place of worship in Arayoor. People worship the deity Lord Mahadeva there. Arayoor Shiva is fondly called Arayoorappan. The Upaprathistas here are Sree Ganesh, Durga, Murugan, Nandikesan, Lord Ayyappa, Bhoothathan, Nagaraja, Yakshiyamma etc.

Churches 
 C.S.I
 St. Elizabeth Church
 India Assemblies of God
 Bible Faith Mission

Others 
 P.R.D.S

Schools 
 Govt. L.V.H.S.S. Arayoor.
 L.M.S.L.P.S. Arayoor.
 Fathima Public School, Arayoor  http://www.fps.edu.in/

Banks 
 Arayoor Service Co. Bank Ltd.

Offices 
 KELPALM, Kerala State Palmyrah Products development Welfare Corporation Ltd, Kelpalm Facility Centre, Kottamam, Arayoor P.O

Library
 C.V. Raman Pillai Memorial Library

Arts and sports clubs 
 C.V.R. Arts
 Arayoor Grama Seva Samithi
 ASVAS
 Chaithram
 Friends

Studios 
 Pranavam

Nearby places 
 Udiyankulangara
 Kottamam
 Puthukulam
 Ponvila
 Pottayilkada
 Plamoottukada
 Thottinkara
 Abhedananda Nagar
 Mariyapuram
 Kochottukonam

Local places 
 Mathrakkal
 CVR Nagar
 Punnathanam
 Ponnankara
 Elluvila
 Vattavila
 Mannamkulam
 Nachuvilakam
 Kanjamvila
 Vaniyankala
 Pottakkal
 Ambalathuvila
 Pavarathuvila
 Kalppakaseri
 Kambrakkara
 Enthikkala
 Nandavanathu
 Manaluvila
 Cherukara
 Clavarakkal
 Puliyarakkal
 Deviyarakkal
 Chavalloor Potta
 Koditharakuzhi
 Oottamkulam
 Kannankara
 Muttattukonam
 Kulachavilakam
 Kuttivelil
 Naduvila
 Painkara
 Kumbamvila
 Kalayil
 Kuruvikkadu
 Alathara
 Charakkal
 Pulimoottil
 Arappura
 Pallam
 Machingavilakam
 Varyaveettu vilakam
 Keeramparakkal
 Thoppil
 Kalivilakam
 Kalathuvila
 Vettampalli
 Thottathuvila
 Edatharavila

References

 http://indiankshetras.com/aarayoor-major-sree-mahadevar-temple-Thiruvananthapuram-kerala-indiankshetra-360degree-photography-panorama?filter_name=arayoor
 https://www.facebook.com/cvrnagar
 https://www.facebook.com/pages/Arayoor-Sree-Mahadeva-Temple/1554034998152684
 www.facebook.com/arayoorsreemahadevar
 http://coastcoast.ca/Profiles/cmd-profile.html
 https://web.archive.org/web/20150403222049/http://ambalangal.com/Thiruvananthapuram.asp?PageNum=4&place=Thiruvananthapuram&district=
 ആറയൂർ ശ്രീ മഹാദേവക്ഷേത്രം

Villages in Thiruvananthapuram district